The Hamilton-Brown Shoe Factory was the first large scale industrial operation in Columbia, Missouri.  It was built in 1906-1907 by the Brown Shoe Company, the largest shoe manufacture in the world at the time.  It was the first plant built outside of St. Louis and was operational from 1907-1939 The building today has been converted into offices.

The company was a large manufacturer of men's, women's and children's shoes. In 1888, the Hamilton-Brown Shoe Company built a factory at the northeast corner of 21st and Locust in a fading upper-class residential neighborhood in St. Louis. Already a force in St. Louis industry, the company doubled its sales between 1890 and 1900. By the early 20th century, Hamilton-Brown with six manufacturing facilities claimed world leadership in boots and shoes.

At one time, the company was the largest shoe manufacturer in the world. Their product line brand included the "American Gentleman" and "American Lady".

It was listed on the National Register of Historic Places in 2002.

See also
 Hamilton-Brown Shoe Company Building
 Brown Shoe Company Factory
 Brown Shoe Company's Homes-Take Factory

References

Industrial buildings and structures on the National Register of Historic Places in Missouri
Industrial buildings completed in 1907
Buildings and structures in Columbia, Missouri
National Register of Historic Places in Boone County, Missouri
Shoe factories
Office buildings in Columbia, Missouri
Caleres
1907 establishments in Missouri